Four Roads is a village in County Roscommon. It is situated about 16 km from Roscommon town, and about 28 km from Athlone.

Gaelic games 
Four Roads GAA club, founded in 1904, is the most successful hurling club in Roscommon, with 34 Roscommon Senior Hurling Championship titles. 

Four Roads Camogie club have also had success at county and national level, winning seven county championships in a row between 2008 and 2014. In the middle of those wins, they won the 2010 All Ireland Junior Club title.

References

Towns and villages in County Roscommon